Osinnik is a rural locality (a village) in Mayskoye Rural Settlement, Vologodsky District, Vologda Oblast, Russia. The population was 16 as of 2002.

Geography 
Osinnik is located 28 km northwest of Vologda (the district's administrative centre) by road. Kalinkino is the nearest rural locality.

References 

Rural localities in Vologodsky District